A meia-lua de compasso (lit. compass half moon) is a technique found in the martial art of capoeira that combines an evasive maneuver with a reverse roundhouse kick. It is considered one of the most powerful and efficient kicks of the art and one of its most iconic movements along with the rasteira. It is even considered that a capoeirista's general skill level can be determined on how hard and fast they are able to execute a meia-lua de compasso.

History

The origin of the meia-lua de compasso is unknown, although one myth describes how the African slaves who created capoeira were forced to develop their techniques while having their hands chained, which gave birth to golpes rodados (spinning attacks) in which hands were put on the ground to support their bodies.

There are reports from around the 1910s of a capoeirista named Francisco da Silva Ciríaco defeating a jiu-jitsu instructor named Sada Miyako with this kick.

The movement was introduced in mixed martial arts in 2009 by Brazilian fighter Marcus "Lelo" Aurélio (also known as Professor Barrãozinho), who knocked out his opponent Keegan Marshall with it. He was followed in 2011 by Cairo Rocha, who knocked out Francesco Neves with a meia-lua de compasso.

Technique
The technique starts with the user standing up or semi-crouched in the position of ginga. By twisting his body towards one side and downing one or both hands onto the ground for balance, he launches the opposite leg into the air in a semi-circular movement that ends with his heel striking the opponent, usually in the head, or completing the spin into another ginga position. The power of the kick derives its energy from the similar centripetal force of a golf club swing.

Variations

Meia-lua de compasso dupla
This is a version of the kick done without either leg in contact with the ground. It combines the motions of a diagonal front handspring and a meia-lua compasso using only the hand or hands to support the body during the kick and complete the spin. It is rarely seen because engaging the core muscles that it uses requires a high level of balance and strength.

Meia-lua solta
The meia-lua solta is executed in the opposite manner as the meia-lua de compasso dupla. Whereas in the dupla the arms are solely used, in the solta only the pivoting leg and foot are used. It is said to be much faster than the meia-lua de compasso but also much riskier. Taking a foot sweep while performing this can be dangerous because of the lack of a supporting arm to spot the kick. Some groups refer to this as a chibata because of its fast whipping motion.

Meia-lua reversão
A kick that begins as a meia-lua de compasso but ends like a front walkover. The capoeirista releases the kick, but instead of bringing the kicking leg around to complete the motion, he follows the kick with his entire body. He will usually land on the kicking leg and rotate 180 degrees to face the other player again.

Meia-lua queda de rins
This move is a combination of a meia-lua de compasso and a queda de rins. While turning to release the kick, the capoeirista lowers himself unto his supporting elbow. He/she can complete the movement in a number of ways, with the most common one being the transition into the resistençia.

Rabo de arraia 
Rabo de arraia (lit. stingray's tail) is a term used in capoeira to describe a kicking technique. While it is sometimes used as a synonym to meia-lua de compasso, there is controversy between authors about whether it is such or it refers a completely different kick.

In his 2007's Little Capoeira Book, Nestor Capoeira put both techniques together as one and the same. However, Gerard Taylor described Mestre Pastinha's rabo de arraia as a "lower spinning kick" without mentioning the usage of hands, a theory Pedro J. Martín supports by equating further the term to the meia-lua de compasso solta. Nevertheless, Taylor also acknowledged the name could mean different techniques according to region. To add greater confusion, the rabo de arraia seems to have been another name for the aú batido in Mestre Sinhozinho's capoeira carioca.

In 2012, Nestor Capoeira addressed the controversy in his book Capoeira: Roots of the Dance-Fight-Game, acknowledging that many movements in capoeira, particularly the meia-lua de compasso, were called rabo de arraia. However, he described the authentic movement as one in which the user performed a handstand in front of the opponent, striking him with the heel before returning to the standing position.

In popular culture
Professional wrestler John Morrison has used this kick in several occasions, as well as film actors and stuntmen Lateef Crowder and Marrese Crump.

See also
 List of capoeira techniques
 Reverse roundhouse kick

References

Kicks
Martial art techniques
Capoeira